Ballidu is a town in the Central Midlands division of the Wheatbelt region of Western Australia, about  north of Perth.

History
The name Ballidu is a hybrid name, coming from "balli", a Noongar word meaning "on this side" or "in this direction", and "Duli" after a nearby rockhole. The townsite was gazetted in 1914, with street names of the original settlers. A primary school opened in the town on 4 September 1922, moving into permanent premises in 1924. The streets in Ballidu are named after varieties of wheat.

The bulk wheat bins in town opened in 1940.

Population
Located in the Central Midlands division of the Wheatbelt, the town relies upon agriculture, mainly wheat production. Increasing automation in agriculture has seen the size of surrounding holdings increase and the population of the town steadily decrease. At the 2016 census, Ballidu had a population of 66, down from 82 in 2006.  The town retains a primary school, an art gallery, a hall and a general store. 2016 saw a school enrolment of four.

Community events

Bike It To Ballidu 
The "Bike It To Ballidu" event was established in 1999 by Matt Osborne, and consists of teams cycling, in turn, from Wongan Hills to Ballidu. At the end, food, beverages, and entertainment are provided in Alpha Park. The event was initially intended as a fundraising activity for the Ballidu Primary School, which closed in 2016 due to low enrolment figures, with the Ballidu Progress Group now managing and coordinating the activity. The ride has occurred each year since 1999, with the exception of 2020 due to the COVID-19 pandemic.

Other community activities 
The Contemporary Arts Society regularly hold exhibitions of local artists and well known Australian artists.

References

External links

Towns in Western Australia
Wheatbelt (Western Australia)
Grain receival points of Western Australia